Cabezón de Pisuerga is a municipality located in the province of Valladolid, Castile and León, Spain. 

According to the 2004 census (INE), the municipality had a population of 2,344 inhabitants.

History
The village was the site of the Battle of Cabezón, a Spanish defeat in the Peninsular War.

See also
Cigales (DO)
Cuisine of the province of Valladolid

References

Municipalities in the Province of Valladolid